A checkoff or check-off is a bookkeeping mechanism that provides for regular payment of an obligation such as union dues.  The same term is used to refer to a tax on sales of agricultural goods that finance a generic commodity marketing program; one example is the commodity checkoff programs mandated by the United States Department of Agriculture to promote sales of milk, beef, soybeans, or sorghum. Some US states offer income tax checkoffs to contribute voluntarily to various state programs.

See also 
 Rand formula
 Presidential election campaign fund checkoff

References 

Accounting terminology